The discography of South Korean musician BoA consists of twenty-one studio albums (three of which were reissued), eight compilation albums, three extended plays (EPs) and numerous singles. BoA debuted as a musician through South Korean talent agency SM Entertainment at the age of 13 with the album ID; Peace B (2000), followed by her debut in Japan with Avex Trax in 2001.

BoA has seen commercial success in both South Korea and Japan. Her first two Japanese albums, Listen to My Heart (2002) and Valenti (2003), were both certified for one million copies shipped by the Recording Industry Association of Japan, and her second Korean album No. 1 (2002) sold over 500,000 copies in South Korea. Many of her songs have been released bilingually in both territories, such as "Valenti" (2002), "Double" (2003), "Everlasting" (2006) and "Only One" (2013).

After releasing her fifth Korean album Girls on Top in 2005, BoA focused her activities on Japan, releasing the albums Outgrow (2006), Made in Twenty (20) (2007) and The Face (2008). In 2008, BoA made her debut in the United States with the single "Eat You Up", followed by the album BoA (2009). In 2010, BoA released her first Korean language album in five years, Hurricane Venus.


Albums

Studio albums

Special albums

Remix albums

Compilation albums

Live albums

Extended plays

Singles

As a lead artist

As a collaborating artist

Promotional singles

Other charted songs

Other appearances
The following songs are not singles or promotional singles and have not appeared on an album by BoA.

Notes

References

Discography
Discographies of South Korean artists
K-pop discographies
Rhythm and blues discographies